In mathematics, the Karoubi conjecture is a conjecture by  that the  algebraic and topological K-theories coincide on  C* algebras spatially tensored with the algebra of compact operators.

References

Operator algebras
K-theory
Theorems in algebraic topology